The Elizabeth River is a minor perennial river located in the Somerset Land District, in the Midlands region of Tasmania, Australia.

Location and features
The Elizabeth River rises below Lake Leake and flows generally west by north through the traditional lands of the Peenrymairmemener and Tyrrernotepanner Clans of the North Midlands Nation. The palawa kani name for the river is pantukina layapinta, the prefix pantukina referring to the country around modern day . The river reaches its confluence with the Macquarie River west of Campbell Town. The river was originally known by colonials in the first decade of the 19th century as Relief Creek, but was renamed by Governor Macquarie, for his wife, when he passed through in 1811. The river descends  over its  course.

The Red Bridge crosses the Elizabeth River at Campbell Town.

See also

 Rivers of Tasmania

References

Rivers of Tasmania
Midlands (Tasmania)